Etienne Regnault was the first governor of Réunion. He arrived on the island on 10 July 1665 on the ship Taureau with a group of 20 settlers sent by the French East India Company.  He founded the towns of Sainte-Suzanne and Saint-Denis and served as governor of the colony until 1671, after which he was succeeded by Jacques de la Heure. Regnault continued his service to the East India Company in Surat and Pondicherry, until his death in 1688 in Bengal.

References 

Tourism Office of Saint-Paul (Reunion), retrieved 2011-10-11

World Statesmen List of Governors of Reunion, retrieved 2011-10-11

Governors of Réunion
 1688 deaths
 French East India Company